"Reason" is a short poem of sixteen lines by C. S. Lewis, written in about 1925.

Text

Background 
The poem, initially untitled in manuscript form, was only published posthumously in Walter Hooper's critical edition The Collected Poems of C.S. Lewis, and is entitled therein "Reason". It has been suggested that a more correct title would be "Reason and Imagination". Hooper dates the poem to as early as 1925—after Lewis embraced theism, but before his conversion to Christianity in 1931.

Analysis 
According to Malcolm Guite, "The poem offers an extended metaphor of the soul as an inner Athens divided between the two Goddesses, Athene, who represents Reason, and Demeter, who represents the Imagination." The speaker wishes to reconcile the two forces within himself, and in the sestet poses an unanswered question: "Oh who will reconcile in me both maid and mother, …?" Guite finds allusion to the Annunciation in these lines, and sees in the spatial language of the poem the following passage from Ephesians:

References

Sources 

 Guite, Malcolm (2010). "Poet". In MacSwain, Robert, & Ward, Michael (eds.). The Cambridge Companion to C. S. Lewis. United Kingdom: Cambridge University Press. pp. 294–308
 Guite, Malcolm (2016). "Telling the Truth through Imaginative Fiction: C. S. Lewis on the Reconciliation of Athene and Demeter". In Ward, Michael, & Williams, Peter S. (eds.). C. S. Lewis at Poets' Corner. Eugene, OR: Cascade Books. pp. 15–24.
 King, Don W. (2001). C. S. Lewis, Poet: The Legacy of His Poetic Impulse. Kent, Ohio & London: The Kent State University Press. pp. 196–197.
 Lindskoog, Kathryn (15 December 1979). "Getting It Together: Lewis and the Two Hemispheres of Knowing". Mythlore, 6(1/13): pp. 43–45.

1920s poems
British poems